Magic Villa is the debut solo album by Swedish hip hop artist Thomas Rusiak. The album peaked at #9 on the Swedish album chart on 10 August 2000

Track listing
All songs written and produced by Thomas Rusiak, except where noted.
 "Featherweight" – 6:05
 "Whole Lot of Things" – 3:41
 "All Yours" – 3:52
Featuring Awa
 "She" – 5:33
Featuring Masayah
 "Fire Walk With Me" – 3:43
Featuring Pee Wee
 "Hiphopper" – 4:48
Featuring Teddybears STHLM
 "Existence" – 5:34
Featuring Titiyo
 "Pearls" – 4:20
 "STHLM's Finest" – 2:29
Featuring Teddybears STHLM
 "Ahead of My Time" – 3:11
 "Breakout" – 8:23
 "Magic Villa" – 6:13

References 

2000 debut albums
Thomas Rusiak albums